Astrobrite is an American shoegazing project by Scott Cortez (lovesliescrushing)  which has included: Melissa Arpin-Duimstra, Andrew Prinz (Mahogany), Odell Nails (Majesty Crush), Rob Smith (Paik and Deep Red), Doug Walker (Xebec), Narasaki (Coaltar of the Deepers), Jason Baron, Andrew Marrah (Airiel and New Canyons), Laura Callier (Gel Set), Sophie Brochu (Fauvely), as well as other members.  Astrobrite began in 1993 as a solo project and, in 1995, the band expanded in order to tour. Astrobrite went on an initial hiatus in 1997 and Scott Cortez moved to Toledo, Ohio for six months. Early in 1998, he relocated to Chicago.

Career 
In 2001, Astrobrite's first album Crush was released, composed of material from the 95-97 period.  Adam Cooper (Alison's Halo) mastered and mixed Crush and 8 Candy EP. 

Later in 2001, Scott Cortez flew to Tokyo, Japan to play the Seven Winters shoegaze festival. The trip fostered relationships with the Japanese shoegazer community and enabled a return to Japan to record a studio version of "Crush", entitled "Supercrush", the recording featured (Narasaki) of Coaltar of the Deepers, Melt Banana (Watchman), and (Tak) Dive.

In 2004 Astrobrite was signed to Vinyl Junkie Records in Japan and released "Pinkshinyultrablast". 

From 2004 to 2008, in addition to recording Astrobrite material, Cortez was recording and performing with STAR.

On April 17, 2007, a new studio album Whitenoise Superstar (stylised as whitenoisesuperstar) was released under Vinyl Junkie. It was mastered by Narasaki and it features Japanese singer Yukari Tanaka (from Hartfield) in several tracks. Musically, the album adds some atmospheric drum and bass elements to its composition. 

On August 27, 2008, Astrobrite released One Hit Wonder, a compilation album comprising previously unreleased songs and b-sides, with a more lo-fi recording. 

2011 saw the vinyl reissue of Crush on BLVD records, this prompted Cortez to consider performing as Astrobrite again. Breaking another hiatus after nine years, Astrobrite played several live shows in the summer of 2012, including the Part time Punks Shoegaze fest in Los Angeles and the Beautiful Noise festival in 2013. 

Boombox Supernova, was released on November 1, 2011, a compilation album of unreleased songs with ambient influences from 1994-1998. 

Next year, on August 14, 2012, a studio album titled All The Stars Will Fall (stylised in all lowercase) was released. The third and last track, "Wandering Birds (Blind)" and "Till The Stars Fall From The Sky" respectively, feature vocals from Japanese singer Linden (Purple Bloom). 

In October 2014, Astrobrite became a three-piece group when Sophie Brochu (guitar, vocals), and Sarah Sterling (drums) joined the band. 

In 2015 Deluxer was released by Vinyl Junkie and Astrobrite did a small tour of Japan in support of the release. The album features vocals from singer Sophie Nagelberg. Astrobrite dedicated the album to Danny Lackey.

Discography

EPs
 Candy Swirl EP (1994) cassette
 Cherryflavor EP (1995) cassette
 Futuramic EP (1996) cassette
 Smile EP (1997) cassette
 Everything (1997) cassette
 Sugar Blast (1999) cd-r
 8 Candy EP (2001) cd
 Noriko EP (2002) download

Albums
 Crush (2001)
 Superdupercrush (2002; Wavertone cd-r; alternate version of Super Crush)
 Pinkshinyultrablast (2002; Wavertone cd-r; alternate version of 2005 release)
 Super Crush (2002)
 Pinkshinyultrablast (2005)
 Whitenoise Superstar (2007)
 One Hit Wonder (2008)
 Crush (2010; BLVD 001 vinyl reissue of first album)
 Boombox Supernova (2011)
 All the stars will fall (2012)
 Deluxer (2015)

Singles
 Slowpoke/Overdriver (1996; clear vinyl)
 Suckerpunch/Peach fuzz (1996; blue translucent vinyl)
 Jingle Bells (2001, digital self-released)
 Her Beautiful Skin/My Forgotten Valentine (2011, digital self-released)
 I Am Endless Sky (2013, digital self-released, tribute to Danny Lackey)

References

External links
 Astrobrite MySpace Page
 Astrobrite Bandcamp Page
 Strangeways Radio Shoegaze Spotlight on Astrobrite
 Vinyl Junkie Home Page (current label)

American shoegaze musical groups
Noise pop musical groups
Rock music supergroups
Musical groups established in 1994
1994 establishments in the United States